St. Paul Baptist Church or St. Paul's Baptist Church may refer to:

 St. Paul Baptist Church (Tarboro, North Carolina)
 St. Paul Baptist Church (St. Albans, West Virginia)
 St. Paul Baptist Church-Morehead School, Kinder, LA, listed on the NRHP in Louisiana
 St. Paul Baptist Church and Cemetery, Meeker, OK, listed on the NRHP in Oklahoma
 St. Paul's Baptist Church (Paris, Texas), listed on the NRHP in Texas